Madame Wants No Children is a 1926 German silent drama film directed by Alexander Korda and starring María Corda, Harry Liedtke and Maria Paudler. It is based on the novel Madame ne veut pas d'enfants by the French writer Clément Vautel. The film was made for the American Fox Film Corporation's German subsidiary. The film was shot at Tempelhof Studios in late 1926. It was the last European film Korda made until 1930 as he left for the United States shortly after its production (although an earlier film, A Modern Dubarry, premiered later).

Cast
María Corda as Elyane Parizot
Harry Liedtke as Paul
Maria Paudler as Louise Bonvin
Trude Hesterberg as Elyane's mother
Dina Gralla as Lulu, Elyane's sister
Hermann Vallentin as Paul's uncle
Camilla von Hollay as Louise's maid
Olga Mannel as Louise's cook
Ellen Mueller as Elyane's maid
Camilla Horn as Dancer
Marlene Dietrich as Extra
John Loder as Extra

References

External links

German silent feature films
German drama films
Films of the Weimar Republic
Films directed by Alexander Korda
Films based on French novels
1926 drama films
Fox Film films
Films shot at Tempelhof Studios
German black-and-white films
1920s American films
1920s German films